Anneville-Ambourville is a commune in the Seine-Maritime department in the Normandy region in northern France.

Geography

Heraldry

Population

Places of interest
 The thirteenth-century château d'Ambourville, known as the 'Templars manorhouse', with an octagonal dovecote.
 The château des Girouettes (or the manor of the Grand-Hôtel) with a 17th-century dovecote and chapel.
 The sixteenth-century Brescy manorhouse.
 The Manor de La Cheminée Tournante, dating from the seventeenth century.
 The church of St.Remi, dating from the sixteenth century.
 The church of Notre-Dame, dating from the sixteenth century.
 The sixteenth-century stone cross.

See also
Communes of the Seine-Maritime department

References

Communes of Seine-Maritime